The 2012 Yemeni President Cup is the 14th edition to be held and back after a years absence due to the 2011 Yemeni revolution.

The winners qualify for the 2013 AFC Cup.

The competition started in October with a Preliminary Round featuring four sides. The winners advance to the round of 32 and then so on in a knockout basis played over one game.

Preliminary round

|}

 1 Al Ahly Al Hadyadh left the field during play and the result was awarded 3:0 to Al-Tali'aa Taizz

Round of 32

|}

 1 Shabab Al Jeel failed to turn up and the result was awarded 3:0 to Al Shrth
 2 Hassan failed to turn up and the result was awarded 3:0 to Al Fateh

Round of 16

Quarter finals

|}

Semi finals

|}

Final

References
Soccerway.com

Yemeni President Cup
Pres